Tytroca fasciolata is a moth of the family Noctuidae first described by William Warren and Walter Rothschild in 1905. It is found from Africa, (including Algeria, Chad, Egypt, Kenya, Mauritania, Oman, Saudi Arabia, Sudan, Saudi Arabia, Yemen), through the Arabian Peninsula (including the United Arab Emirates) to India.

References

Catocalinae